Charles Monck may refer to:

Charles Monck (1678–1751), Irish MP for Newcastle and Inistiogue
Charles Monck, 1st Viscount Monck (1754–1802)
Charles Monck, 3rd Viscount Monck (1791–1849)
Charles Monck, 4th Viscount Monck (1819–1894)
Sir Charles Monck, 6th Baronet (1779–1867)